Developable mechanisms are a special class of mechanisms that can be placed on developable surfaces.

Examples 

Some well-known examples of developable mechanisms include the door on the Apollo Command Module and the cargo doors on the Space Shuttle.  Both of these examples are single-hinge-line mechanisms. Note how in each case the joint axes are in line with the ruling lines of the surface. Images are shown on the right.

Origami uses developable surfaces because the paper can be assumed to not stretch. Action origami utilizes the movement of the origami. 

Ortho-planar mechanisms are a subset of developable mechanisms where the developable surface is a plane and the links emerge out of the plane. Lamina Emergent Mechanisms are ortho-planar mechanisms (and hence also developable mechanisms) where the joints are compliant mechanisms. The same joints used to create lamina emergent mechanisms can be used to approximate developable surfaces

Advantages 
Developable surfaces are easy to manufacture and are found in many applications.  Developable mechanism can be embedded within these surfaces.

Developable mechanisms are deployable. 

Developable mechanism stow compactly during one position of the mechanism's motion.

Mathematical Modeling 
The motion of developable mechanisms can be modeled using traditional kinematics formulas.  In rigid-body linkages, the shape of the rigid links does not change the motion.

References

External links 
About Developable Mechanisms
Video about the applications and development of Developable Mechanisms

Mechanisms (engineering)